Aconodes obliquatus is a species of beetle in the family Cerambycidae. It was described by Stephan von Breuning in 1939. It is known from Myanmar.

It is 8–9 mm long and 3–3¼ mm wide, and its type locality was listed as "Ruby Mines", Myanmar.

References

Aconodes
Beetles described in 1939
Taxa named by Stephan von Breuning (entomologist)